Philip Jennings (b Wantage 3 November 1783 – d  Coston, Norfolk 20 December 1849) was Archdeacon of Norfolk from 13 August 1847 until his death.

Jennings was educated at Worcester College, Oxford, matriculating in 1802, and graduating B.A. in 1806, M.A. in 1809. He was for many years the Minister of St Jame's Chapel, Marylebone. In 1847 he became Rector of Coston.

Notes

1783 births
People from Wantage
1849 deaths
19th-century English Anglican priests
Archdeacons of Norfolk
Alumni of Worcester College, Oxford